Hassan Sherif (born 19 August 1952) is an Ethiopian boxer. He competed in the men's flyweight event at the 1980 Summer Olympics. At the 1980 Summer Olympics, he defeated Barry Aguibou of Guinea, before losing to Petar Lesov of Bulgaria.

References

External links
 

1952 births
Living people
Ethiopian male boxers
Olympic boxers of Ethiopia
Boxers at the 1980 Summer Olympics
Place of birth missing (living people)
Flyweight boxers